Asura effulgens is a moth of the subfamily Arctiinae. It is found in Papua New Guinea.

References

Moths of Papua New Guinea
Arctiinae